Nurses is a television series that originally ran on NBC for three seasons between 1991 and 1994.

Series overview

Episodes

Season 1 (1991–92)

Season 2 (1992–93)

Season 3 (1993–94)

References

External links
 
 

Nurses